Southwestern Medical District/Parkland station is a DART Light Rail station in Dallas, Texas. The station opened as part of the Green Line's expansion in December 2010. It serves nearby locations such as UT Southwestern Medical Center and School, Parkland Hospital, Children's Medical Center and other major medical institutions.

References

External links 
Dallas Area Rapid Transit - Southwestern Medical District/Parkland Station

Dallas Area Rapid Transit light rail stations in Dallas
Railway stations in the United States opened in 2010
2010 establishments in Texas
Railway stations in Dallas County, Texas